Stelis virgata is a species of orchid plant native to Peru.

References 

virgata
Flora of Peru